Stevenson-Pincince Field is a stadium in Providence, Rhode Island on the campus of Brown University. It is home to the Brown Bears soccer and lacrosse programs.

Name
The stadium was named in 1979 for longtime men's soccer coach Cliff Stevenson, who was successful in establishing a men's soccer program at Brown during the 1960s. Corruption undermined that success in the 1970s and 1980s during which time, as he recruited many exceptionally weak players, Stevenson frequently dressed ringers (including former professional soccer players who were working in the university's Buildings and Grounds department) and sent them into games as if they were student players. Thus in 2015, the facility was renamed Stevenson-Pincince Field to also honor longtime women's soccer coach Phil Pincince.

Description and history
The stadium seats 3,500 and has hosted games in both the NCAA soccer and lacrosse tournaments. In 2001 and again in 2012, Stevenson-Pincince Field received upgrades to its lighting and field surface.

On April 3, 2019, Brown University announced that the aluminum bleachers and pressbox would be replaced with a new 3-story, 22,500 sf stadium facility, complete with dedicated team locker rooms and training, coaches' offices, and public restrooms and concessions. The facility was completed in February 2020.

Notes

Soccer venues in Rhode Island
Lacrosse venues in the United States
Brown Bears
Buildings and structures in Providence, Rhode Island
Sports venues in Providence County, Rhode Island